Emil Krause (21 January 1908 – 2 August 1962) was a German international footballer.

References

External links
 

1908 births
1962 deaths
Association football defenders
German footballers
Germany international footballers
Wacker 04 Berlin players
Tennis Borussia Berlin players
Hertha BSC players